Eeramana Rojave is a 2018–2021 Indian Tamil-language language romantic drama television series, starring Pavithra Janani, Dhiraviam Rajkumaran, Shyam, Sai Gayatri Bhuvanesh, Praveen Devasagayam and Archana Kumar. The show is produced by Signature Productionz and directed by Francis Kathiravan, Rishi and Ravi Priyan. This show has 2 Seasons. It premiered on 9 July 2018 and aired on Star Vijay. After airing for 3 years, the show went off air on 14 August 2021 with 807 Episodes.

Summary

Malarvizhi falls in love with Maran and they decide to marry. On the day of their wedding, Maran dies in an accident and his younger brother Vetri is forced to marry Malarvizhi. The story then revolves around Vetri and Malar's marriage life. After the marriage, Malar refuses to live with Vetri and scolds him for everything. Vetri's love interest, Anjali starts troubling Vetri for cheating on her. Malar and Vetri become friends after knowing that he hurt himself in order to stop the wedding night ritual for them. Once Malar wants to write an exam in Chennai. Vetri convinces his mother and take her to the exam venue where someone steals her bag in which she has kept the hall ticket. Vetri arranges for a new one saying that hall ticket was lost in 'Gaja' storm. A girl sitting near Malar copies and puts the blame on Malar. Vetri comes and rescues her on time.

Vetri's friend Idhayakani, uncle Thangarasu and grandfather make him believe that he loves Malar. On a parallel story line, Azhagar, a relative from their maternal side troubles Malar's younger sister Akhila to marry him, but is always disrespected by her in return. One day, he takes a video of her changing clothes and blackmails her incognito. This threat leaves Akhila stranded in sorrow. Not knowing the true identity of the blackmailer, Akhila's father arranges her marriage with Azhagar, as he thinks he would accept her, despite the video, since he is his relative. Akhila seeks Vetri's help to find the blackmailer and on the day of her wedding with Azhagar, Vetri exposes the truth and Azhagar gets arrested. Vetri and his family convince Pugazh, Vetri's younger brother into marrying Akhila. Akhila and Pugazh have a troubled marital relationship since he is constantly triggered against her by his mother, sisters and Azhagar.

When Akhila and Pugazh goes to Akila's house to have a customary lunch (as there are newly married), to support them Vetri and Malar also accompany them. There, Vetri gives Kammapandi 25 lakhs to solve his money problems. Traditionial customs mean that the bride's family are to gift the newly married couple during this lunch. Since Akhila's father is unable to do so due to his money problems, Pughzh wears Vetri's jewels and goes back to their home but luckily their mother doesn't find out. Vetri becomes a farmer, whilst Malar gets a teaching job through the exam she had written, her in-laws forbid her to go to work. Meanwhile Pugazh remains unemployed. So through some insults and petty fights, Akhila somehow manages to send Pugazh to work than being home. Somehow through Anjali, Malar and Akhila's in-laws find out about Vetri helping the girls' family with money, a big problem occurs which leads to both of the sisters getting kicked out of the house and both of the families in great desperation. Vetri starts to miss Malar more, whereas Pugazh misses Akhila badly cause he has gotten used to their silly fights and bickering. Later, Akhila too starts to feel something for Pugazh but is not ready to name it. Pugazh finds his childhood friend Puppy's number, but does not realise it is Akhila herself. They text each other and Akhila writes like Puppy loves Pugazh, to understand whether his love for Akhila is genuine. Akhila asks her friend Geetha to act as Puppy. When Geetha accepts and meets Pugazh, he turns her down stating he loves Akhila. Pugazh and Akhila reunite and she also revealed that she is the real Puppy. The story is centred around the two pairs Malar-Vetri and Pughal-Akhila, added with another couple Azhagar-Thenu.

Cast

Main
 Dhiraviam Rajakumaran as Vetrivel Naatarasan 
 Pavithra Janani as Malarvizhi Vetrivel

Supporting
 Shyam as Pugazhandi 
 Sai Gayathri Bhuvanesh as Akhilandeshwari Pugazhendi 
 Kumaran as Maran
 Praveen Devasagayam as Azhagar 
 Sheela (2018-2019) and Archana Kumar (2019–2021) as Thenmozhi Azhagar  Thenu:
 Kumaramoorthi as Idhayarkani
 Gemini Mani as Thangarasu
 Nisha as Eshwari Thangarasu (a.k.a. Eshu)
 Venkat (2018-2020) and Muthu Kumara Swamy (2021) as Naatarasan , father of Maran,  Vetri and Pughazhendi
 Vijisha (2018), Yuvasree (2018–2020), and Deepa Nethran (2020–2021) as Anbukarasi Naatarasan, mother of Maran, Vetri and Pugazhendi
 Kammapandi (2018-2021) and Pondy Ravi (2021) as Rajadurai
 Premalatha as Indirani Rajadurai
 Ramya Joseph as Pavanu Idhayarkani
 Kumaran Thangarajan as Maran Naatarasan
 Poovai Suresh as Pusari
 Babitha as Santha
  Nivisha Kingkon (2018–2020) and Anu Sulash (2020–2021) as Anjali
 Shanthi as Thangam and Eshwari's mother
 Anju as Anjugam
 Bharathi Mohan as Ambalavaanan
 Madurai Mohan as Malaisamy
 S. N. Parvathy as Pappamaal
 Akshara as Selvi
 Pradeep Kumar as Maruthu
 Sathish as Pandi
 Chitra as Mayilu
 Rhema Ashok as Swetha
 Aravesh Kumar as Jeeva

Casting
The series revolves around two families. Pavithra who was formerly in Saravanan Meenatchi (season 3) will be portraying female lead as a village girl while, Dhiraviam Rajakumaran plays the male lead and Kumaran Thangarajan plays the love interest of the female lead, Nivisha will be portraying love interest of the male lead but replaced by Anu Sulash. Later Thangarasu was replaced by V. Muthukumarasamy. Kalyana Veedu and Bommalattam serials fame. Official teaser has been released by Star Vijay in YouTube on 1 July 2018. The supporting cast also includes Shyam, Nisha, Sai Gayatri Bhuvanesh and Venkat.

Adaptations

References

External links
Official website at Hotstar
 

Star Vijay original programming
2010s Tamil-language television series
Tamil-language romance television series
2018 Tamil-language television series debuts
Tamil-language television shows
2021 Tamil-language television series endings